The GNA/Glendale Federal Classic was a golf tournament on the LPGA Tour from 1985 to 1987. It was played at the Oakmont Country Club in Glendale, California.

Winners
GNA/Glendale Federal Classic
1987 Jane Geddes
1986 Christa Johnson

GNA Classic
1985 Jan Stephenson

References

External links
Oakmont Country Club

Former LPGA Tour events
Golf in California
Sports competitions in Los Angeles County, California
Glendale, California
Women's sports in California